HR 3407 is a single star in the southern constellation of Vela. It has the Bayer designation C Velorum; HR 3407 is the designation in the Bright Star Catalogue. It is an orange-hued star that is dimly visible to the naked eye with an apparent visual magnitude of 5.01. The distance to this object is approximately 1,040 light years based on parallax measurements, and it is drifting further away with a radial velocity of 4 km/s. 

This object is an aging K-type supergiant star with a stellar classification of K1.5Ib. It has about three times the mass of the Sun and has expanded to around 71 times the Sun's radius. It is spinning with a projected rotational velocity of 4.1. The star displays microvariability with a period of 10.99 cycles per day and an amplitude of 0.0036 in magnitude. It is radiating around 1,600 times the luminosity of the Sun from its enlarged photosphere at an effective temperature of 4,324 K.

References

K-type supergiants
Vela (constellation)
Velorum, C
Durchmusterung objects
073155
3407
042088